Yuko Miyazaki is a lawyer and Justice of the Supreme Court of Japan.

She was born on 9 July 1951. Miyazaki earned her legal education respectively from the University of Tokyo (Faculty of Law; 1976) and Harvard Law School (1984). In 1979, after having worked as a legal apprentice, Miyazaki registered with the Daiichi Tokyo Bar Association and began practicing as a taxation attorney. In 1979, she was hired as a permanent attorney at the law firm Nagashima & Ohno. She became legal counsel for the World Bank in 1984. Miyazaki also taught as a visiting professor at Tokyo University and Kyoto University. In January 2018, she became the sixth female appointed as a Justice of the Supreme Court of Japan. Miyazaki is noted as foregoing tradition and becoming the first justice to issue rulings under her maiden name. She is appointed as International Judge of the Singapore International Commercial Court for the period of 5 January 2022 to 4 January 2024.

See also 
 List of Justices of the Supreme Court of Japan
 Supreme Court of Japan
 Singapore International Commercial Court

References 

Supreme Court of Japan justices
University of Tokyo alumni
Harvard Law School alumni
Academic staff of the University of Tokyo
Academic staff of Kyoto University
1951 births
Living people